Kansas's 23rd Senate district is one of 40 districts in the Kansas Senate. It has been represented by Republican Robert Olson since his appointment in 2011 to succeed fellow Republican Karin Brownlee.

Geography
District 23 covers much of Olathe in the south-central Johnson County suburbs of Kansas City.

The district is located entirely within Kansas's 3rd congressional district, and overlaps with the 14th, 15th, 26th, 49th, and 78th districts of the Kansas House of Representatives.

Recent election results

2020

2016

2012

Federal and statewide results in District 23

References

23
Johnson County, Kansas